Eric D. Weitz (15 June 1953 – 1 July 2021) was a professor of history at City University of New York, and the author of several books.

Education 
He studied at Boston University for his MA, and received his PhD supervised by Norman Naimark. His dissertation was "Conflict in the Ruhr: Workers and Socialist Politics in Essen, 1910-1925".

Themes of research and writing 
Weitz specialized in German history, Soviet history, and genocide studies.

According to historian Sarah K. Danielsson, Weitz's historical "work on genocide had always grappled with the root causes of mass violence and extermination, and it led him to look at the history of human rights."

He edited "Human Rights and Crimes against Humanity” at Princeton University Press.

Political views 
Eric Weitz joined a number of scholars in condemning Donald Trump in 2016. He compared Donald Trump's right-wing populism to the political atmosphere in the Weimar Republic. Weitz criticized what he saw as increasing political polarization.

Works

References

1953 births
2021 deaths
21st-century American historians
21st-century American male writers
City University of New York faculty
Graduate Center, CUNY faculty
American male non-fiction writers